German Village Historic District is a registered historic district in Hamilton, Ohio, listed in the National Register of Historic Places on February 7, 1991.  It contains 177 contributing buildings.

German Village contains many community landmarks; these include the octagonal Lane-Hooven House, the Lane Public Library, St. Julie Billart Catholic Church, the Hamilton YWCA, and the Butler County Historical Society.

Historic uses 
Single Dwelling
Specialty Store
School

Notes 

German-American history
National Register of Historic Places in Butler County, Ohio
Historic districts on the National Register of Historic Places in Ohio
Historic districts in Butler County, Ohio
Hamilton, Ohio